Dia Sudeshna Chakravarty (born 1984) is a Bangladeshi-born British political activist, former political director of the TaxPayers' Alliance, singer, and Brexit Editor of The Daily Telegraph.

Early life
Chakravarty was born in Bangladesh to parents of two different faiths. Her Muslim mother, Sultana Kamal, is a lawyer and human rights activist who runs a legal aid organisation in Bangladesh. Her Hindu father, Supriyo Chakravarty, is also a lawyer. Her parents both decided to keep their respective religions after marriage. She is her parents' only child. Her maternal grandmother is poet Sufia Kamal.

Because of Chakravarty's parents' and grandparents' activism and anti-fundamentalist stance, her family have been under threat on and off her whole life. She has grown up with threatening telephone calls and her home has been firebombed twice.

Chakravarty attended a school in Sylhet her parents set up which taught the British Council-regulated O-level curriculum and examination syllabus. The school took students up to the age of 14, after which her schooling was mostly tutorial-based. Later, she entered the mainstream education system to continue with her O-levels. She achieved seven O-levels.

She then got a partial scholarship to sixth-form college in Oxford, to board and sit her A-levels, after her parents remortgaged their family home, she left for the UK in 2001. Her lawyer mother, who had spent most of her life doing voluntary work until then, moved to Dhaka, to take up a full-time job. Chakravarty read Law at the University of Oxford and became a barrister in 2008.

Political activism
Chakravarty started her career as a tax consultant in London before moving into communication and public affairs. From July 2012 to December 2013, she was a deputy director at The Freedom Association where she advocated for freedom of the press, free speech, and freedom of expression. In January 2014, she was appointed political director of the TaxPayers' Alliance.

Chakravarty moved into communications and public affairs. She worked for Banking on Change, a global partnership between Barclays Bank and two international charities seeking to extend access to basic financial services through savings-led microfinance.

In August 2014, Chakravarty appeared on BBC Two's Newsnight, discussing consultancy culture in the public sector. In November 2014 and March 2015, and October 2016, she appeared on BBC One's Question Time. In January 2015, she contributed on BBC Radio 4's Any Questions?

In July 2017, Chakravarty, a prominent Leave campaigner during the UK EU membership Referendum campaign, was appointed Brexit Editor of The Daily Telegraph.

In September 2017, Chakravarty appeared on Question Time. In October, Chakravarty appeared on Newsnight, discussing Brexit. In the same month, she was listed at Number 100 by commentator Iain Dale in his '100 Most Influential on the Right'.

Singing career
Chakravarty took her first music lesson from Prateek Enda in Sylhet and had an early start in her musical training in Rabindranath Tagore songs. Although she specialises in Bengali music, since moving to the UK she has added Hindi songs to her repertoire. She now takes lessons from London-based singer-master Anuradha Roma Choudhury.

Chakravarty performs in London and abroad. In August 2014, her debut album A Bloom in Vain and Other Songs was released.

Personal life
In October 2007, Chakravarty married Duncan Hall. She met her husband while at school and decided to settle in England after completing her university and Bar examinations. Chakravarty is also involved with Udayan, a Bengali cultural group.

Discography

Albums

See also
 British Bangladeshis
 List of British Bangladeshis
 Music of Bengal

References

External links

 
 
 Dia Chakravarty on City A.M.
 Dia Chakravarty on The Freedom Association
 Dia Chakravarty on Last.fm

Living people
1984 births
Date of birth missing (living people)
Bangladeshi emigrants to England
Naturalised citizens of the United Kingdom
British women activists
British political commentators
Political activists
British social commentators
Free speech activists
21st-century Bangladeshi women singers
21st-century Bangladeshi singers
British women singers
Bengali-language singers
Hindi-language singers
British barristers
Bangladeshi women journalists
British newspaper editors
The Daily Telegraph people
21st-century British journalists
Singers from London
People from Sylhet Division
Alumni of the University of Oxford
Laser Vision artists
Women newspaper editors